Okotoks was a provincial electoral district in Alberta, Canada, mandated to return a single member to the Legislative Assembly of Alberta from 1909 to 1930. The electoral district was named after the town of Okotoks.

Okotoks history

Boundary history

Electoral history overview
The Okotoks electoral district was served by a single representative through its entire history. George Hoadley was elected to the Legislative Assembly in the first election held in the district in 1909, and re-elected six times.

Hoadley gained prominence when he became leader of the Conservative Party after Edward Michener resigned the leadership in 1917 and held it until 1920 when he crossed the floor to the United Farmers of Alberta.

Hoadley won re-election as a member of the United Farmers and became Minister of Agriculture when they formed government. He was confirmed to the post by acclamation in a ministerial by-election held in 1921.

The electoral district was abolished in 1930 when it was merged with High River to become Okotoks-High River.

Election results

1909 general election

1913 general election

1917 general election

1921 general election

1921 by-election

1926 general election

See also
List of Alberta provincial electoral districts
Okotoks, Alberta, a town in southern Alberta, Canada

References

Further reading

External links
Elections Alberta
The Legislative Assembly of Alberta

Former provincial electoral districts of Alberta
Okotoks